The men's light welterweight boxing competition at the 2016 Olympic Games in Rio de Janeiro was held from 10 to 21 August at the Riocentro.

The medals for the competition were presented by Sir Austin L. Sealy, KT, Barbados, IOC member, and the gifts were presented by Kelani Bayor, Vice President of the AIBA.

Schedule 
All times are Brasília Time (UTC−3).

Results

Finals

Top half

1 Hu won by walkover as Garcia was injured.

Bottom half

References

Boxing at the 2016 Summer Olympics
Men's events at the 2016 Summer Olympics